Sanjeev–Darshan is a film song composer duo in the Bollywood film industry of India. The duo derives its name from the first names of its two principals, Sanjeev Rathod and Darshan Rathod. Sanjeev and Darshan are the sons of the late Hindi film song composer Shravan Rathod, who himself paired with music director Nadeem as all time great music director duo Nadeem-Shravan. Their first released soundtrack was for the 1999 film Mann.

Early life
Sanjeev and Darshan are sons of legendary Music Director Shri Shravan Rathod who is one half of the all time great musical duo Nadeem-Shravan.
Sanjeev was trained under Pandit Kallika Prasad, while younger brother Darshan picked up several instruments on his own. 
Their grandfather, Pandit Chhaturbhuj Rathod was an avid promoter of classical as well as semi-classical music. 
Born to a musical family, singer Vinod Rathod and musician and singer Roop Kumar Rathod are their paternal uncles.

Music career
Sanjeev–Darshan made their debut as music directors for a film by Mahendra Shah and Vimal Kumar which was never released. In 1998, they composed a Gujarati album for the Shree Swaminarayan Gadi Sansthan. Their first film album was Yeh Raaste Hain Pyaar Ke, which was released in 1998; however, the film was released 3 years later. Indra Kumar had been with the duo at their initial recording and he went on to compose around forty tunes with them. In 1999, he invited them to compose music for his film Mann, starring Aamir Khan and Manisha Koirala . The film was an average success but its songs became hugely popular. All the songs of Mann were copied from other popular hits, a Malaysian singer also filed a case against them for copying his song, and then Iwan won the case later. "Nasha ye pyar ka nasha hain" song copied from Toto Cutungo's "l'italiano" song.

Discography

References

External links
 
 

Sibling musical duos
Indian musical duos
Hindi film score composers
Year of birth missing (living people)
Living people